William Charles "Buzzy" Linhart (March 3, 1943 – February 13, 2020) was an American rock performer, composer, multi-instrumentalist musician and actor.

Early life
Linhart was born in Pittsburgh, Pennsylvania, and raised in Cleveland, Ohio.  He began playing percussion for symphony at the age of seven, switching to vibraphone at ten. At fourteen he entered the Cleveland Music School Settlement. Because of this training he led bands all through school and at the age of 18 entered the U.S. Navy School of Music as a percussionist. 

Buzzy had a sister, Abby Linhart, and a brother, Gair Linhart.

Career

In 1963, he moved to New York City and became friends and roommates with John Sebastian. He also became a protégé of the senior guitarist and folk singer Fred Neil.  One of his first bands, with fellow musicians Steve De Naut, Serge Katzen, and Max Ochs, was Seventh Sons, who released a raga-rock LP for ESP Records.  Linhart later released a series of solo albums from the late 1960s to the mid-1970s starting with his Philips debut buzzy (the title with a small "b") in 1969. Although he entered military service to play in the Navy band, Linhart claimed that during his naval service he was unexpectedly called upon to help fight a fire with inadequate breathing apparatus, causing him chronic lung damage.  As a result, Buzz Linhart was decades ahead of his time in objecting to tobacco smoke in the clubs where he wanted to play.  A frequent guest of radio host Vin Scelsa, he complained of feeling ill "singin' in the smoke."  (source: The Closet, hosted by Vin Scelsa, WFMU 91.1FM, 1967 - 1969)

In 1971 Linhart was signed to Eleuthera Records. Although closely associated with the Greenwich Village folk-rock scene for much of his career, he recorded that first complete solo album in London and Wales with the Welsh prog-rock band Eyes of Blue serving as the backing band.

His skill on the vibraphone led to work as a session musician on recordings by Buffy Sainte-Marie, Richie Havens, Carly Simon, Cat Mother & the All Night Newsboys, and Jimi Hendrix (on the Cry of Love album; he is also credited on Electric Ladyland). In 2005 he recorded "Mr. Cool" on the CD Life Goes On, with Monica Dupont and Gary Novak.

Linhart was joint composer of "(You Got To Have) Friends," a collaboration with Mark "Moogy" Klingman, which became singer Bette Midler's de facto theme song. This was the end of his major label career, but although he never achieved commercial success, Linhart continued to write, record, sing and compose music for many years afterward. Shelley Toscano created a highly acclaimed film documentary, Famous: The Buzzy Linhart Story ©2006 samechick different dogg productions.

Linhart had significant visibility as an actor in the mid-1970s.  He also achieved some notoriety from his appearance in the opening sequence of the cult movie The Groove Tube, as a hippie hitchhiker. He was also a regular on the 1976 television show Cos, starring Bill Cosby.  However, there appears to be little or no surviving footage from the series, unlike the several subsequent Cosby television series.

Illness and death
Linhart suffered a heart attack in May 2018.  He died on February 13, 2020.

Discography
buzzy -  (Philips Records, 1969)
Music -  (Eleuthera Records, 1970)
Jake and the Family Jewels -  (Polydor Records 244029, 1970)
The Time to Live is Now -  (Kama Sutra Records, 1971)
Buzzy (The Black Album) -  (Kama Sutra Records, 1972)
Pussycats Can Go Far - (Atco Records, 1974)
"Tornado" - (Accord Records, 1981)
Four Sides of Buzzy Linhart - 4-song EP (Caromar Records, 1982)
The Buzzy/Moogy Sessions: 1983-1994 - (Moogy Music, 2000)
Buzzy Linhart Loves You: Classic Recordings - (Razor & Tie, 2001)
Studio - (BuzzArt Inc., 2006)
Electric Lady Dream - (BuzzArt Inc., 2012)
Live Cafe Au Go Go (1971) - (BuzzArt Inc., 2013)
Peace in the Country (unplugged) - (BuzzArt Inc., 2015)

References

External links

 

Interview from October 2008 with Buzzy and Robert Silverstein, founder of Music Web Express 3000

1943 births
2020 deaths
American rock singers
American session musicians
Musicians from Pittsburgh
American vibraphonists
Male actors from Pittsburgh